Barceloneta may refer to:
 Barceloneta, Puerto Rico, municipality in Puerto Rico
 Barceloneta, Barcelona, beach and a neighborhood in the Ciutat Vella district of Barcelona, Spain
 Barceloneta (Barcelona Metro)
 Barceloneta, the old nickname of the city of Alghero, Sardinia